Long Line of Leavers is a studio album from Caedmon's Call. It was recorded at the following studios:
The Bennett House - Franklin, Tennessee (engineer Ben Wisch)
The Farm - Marvin, North Carolina (engineer Ed Cash)
Sound Kitchen - Franklin, Tennessee (Engineer Jim Dineen) (produced by Monroe Jones)



Track listing
 "Only One"  – 3:47 (Aaron Tate)
 "Love Is Different"  – 4:33 (Derek Webb)
 "Prepare Ye the Way"  – 4:30 (John Michael Talbot)
 "Prove Me Wrong"  – 2:50 (Tate)
 "Mistake of My Life"  – 3:53 (Webb)
 "Masquerade"  – 4:52 (Ed Cash)
 "What You Want"  – 4:03 (Webb)
 "Valleys Fill First"  – 4:12 (Tate, Cash)
 "Can't Lose You"  – 4:59 (Webb)
 "Love Alone"  – 4:55 (Tate)
 "Dance"  – 5:29 (Webb)
 "Piece of Glass"  – 4:09 (Webb, Danielle Young)
 "Ballad of San Francisco"  – 2:50 (Webb)

Personnel 

Caedmon's Call
 Cliff Young – vocals, guitars
 Derek Webb – vocals, guitars, banjo
 Danielle Young – vocals
 Joshua Moore  – acoustic piano, Rhodes piano, Wurlitzer electric piano, Hammond B3 organ, accordion, harmonica
 Jeff Miller – bass
 Todd Bragg – drums, percussion
 Garett Buell – drums, percussion

Guest musicians

 George Cocchini – electric guitar (1, 7, 9, 12)
 Ed Cash – electric guitar (2), mandolin (2), guitar (3, 4, 5, 8, 11), Rhodes (4), backing vocals (4, 5, 11, 13), acoustic guitar (6, 13), Ebow (12), whistling (13)
 Aaron Senseman – electric guitar (5)
 Gary Burnette – electric guitar (7)
 Monroe Jones – keyboards (7, 10)
 Jeff Roach – keyboards (7, 9, 10)
 Byron House – upright bass (6, 12, 13)
 Mark Hill – bass (7)
 Barry Green – trombone (1)
 Mike Haynes – trumpet (1)
 Kristin Wilkinson – string arrangements (3, 6)
 David Angell – strings (3, 6)
 John Catchings – strings (3, 6)
 David Davidson – strings (3, 6)
 Conni Ellisor – strings (3, 6)
 Carl Gorodetsky – strings (3, 6)
 Richard Grosjean – strings (3, 6)
 Anthony LaMarchina – strings (3, 6)
 Pamela Sixfin – strings (3, 6)
 Mary Kathryn Vanosdale – strings (3, 6)
 Kristin Wilkinson – strings (3, 6)

Production
 Monroe Jones – producer (1, 7, 9, 10)
 Ed Cash – producer (2-6, 8, 11, 12, 13), engineer (5), mixing (5)
 Caedmon's Call – producers (2-6, 8, 11, 12, 13)
 Robert Beeson – executive producer 
 Bob Wohler – executive producer 
 Jim Dineen – recording (1, 7, 9, 10)
 Shane Wilson – mixing (1, 7, 9, 10)
 Chris Fogel – mixing (10)
 Ben Wisch – recording (2, 3, 4, 6, 8, 11, 12, 13), mixing (2, 3, 4, 6, 8, 11, 12, 13)
 Melissa Mattey – recording assistant (1, 7, 9, 10)
 J.C. Monterrosa – mix assistant (1, 7, 9, 10)
 Shawn McLean – assistant engineer (2, 3, 4, 6, 8, 11, 12, 13)
 Scott Cash – assistant engineer (5)
 Bob Boyd – additional recording (5), mastering

Release details
2000, US, Essential Records 10559, Release Date October 10, 2000, CD

References 

Caedmon's Call albums
2001 albums
Essential Records (Christian) albums